Navan was a constituency represented in the Irish House of Commons until 1800.

Members of Parliament
 1560 Patrick Warren and John Wakeley
 1585 Thomas Warren and Thomas Wakeley
 1613–1615 John Warren and Patrick Begg of Boranstown
 1634–1635 Laurence Dowdall of Athlumney and Patrick D'Arcy
 1639–1642 Patrick Manning and Thomas Nangle, 19th Baron of Navan (both expelled)
 1642–1649 William Whyte (died and replaced 1643 by Simon Luttrell) and Walter Harding
 1661–1686 John Preston and Henry Packenham

1689–1801

References

Historic constituencies in County Meath
Constituencies of the Parliament of Ireland (pre-1801)
1800 disestablishments in Ireland
Constituencies disestablished in 1800